Torsby is a locality and the seat of Torsby Municipality in Värmland County, Sweden with 4,049 inhabitants in 2010.

Fortum Ski Tunnel Torsby, the world's longest ski tunnel, is located in Torsby.

Notable people 
 Football manager Sven-Göran Eriksson and footballer Marcus Berg are both from Torsby.
 Monica Kristensen Solås, a glaciologist, meteorologist, polar explorer and crime novelist, was born in Torsby in 1950.

References 

Municipal seats of Värmland County
Swedish municipal seats
Populated places in Torsby Municipality
Värmland

iu:ᑐᕐᔅᐳ
fi:Torsbyn kunta